Enerya is the largest private natural gas distribution company in Turkey. It was founded by STFA Group in 2003. Since 2014, Swiss Partners Group holds 30% of its shares. Apart from natural gas distribution, the company is also active in gas and power trading businesses, and having ongoing investments in renewable energy generation.

Enerya operates as the natural gas distributor across 11 towns in Turkey: Antalya, Aydın, Konya, Çorum, Niğde, Nevşehir, Denizli, Karaman, Erzincan, Aksaray and Ereğli. The firm has 1 million subscribers as of 2016.

See also 

 STFA Holding
 Partners Group

Oil and gas companies of Turkey
Natural gas companies
Energy companies of Turkey
Electric power companies of Turkey
Energy companies established in 2003
Non-renewable resource companies established in 2003
2003 establishments in Turkey